The List of shipwrecks in 1755 includes some ships sunk, wrecked or otherwise lost during 1755.

January

17 January

19 January

24 January

Unknown date

February

14 February

16 February

Unknown date

March

8 March

13 March

21 March

Unknown date

April

4 April

13 April

23 April

Unknown date

May

Unknown date

June

8 June

9 June

10 June

July

1 July

17 July

18 July

Unknown date

August

Unknown date

September

2 September

27 September

Unknown date

October

5 October

6 October

14 October

Unknown date

November

9 November

16 November

29 November

Unknown date

December

15 December

25 December

Unknown date

Unknown date

References

1755